The Osgood Bradley Building is an historic industrial building at 18 Grafton Street in Worcester, Massachusetts.  Completed in 1916, the eight-story brick building is notable for its association with the Osgood Bradley Car Company, an early manufacturer of both railroad cars and automobiles.  The building was listed on the National Register of Historic Places in 2018.

Description and history
The Osgood Bradley Building is located east of downtown Worcester, set close to Interstate 290 on the west side of Grafton Street at Franklin Street.  It is an eight-story masonry structure, built with a concrete frame, and an exterior finished in concrete, brick, terra cotta, and marble.  The main facade is ten bays wide, with two building entrances, four retail spaces between them, and two outer bays with windows only.  The lower two floors are set off from the upper floors by a dentillated cornice, with medallions at the tops of the piers between the bays.  The outer two bays have segmented-arch openings on the second floor, while the inner bays have bays with two pairs of sash windows separated by piers.  Central piers on the upper floors are finished in red brick, in contrast to the pale concrete and terra cotta of the most of the facade.

The Osgood Bradley Company was founded in 1820, and originally manufactured stage coaches, carriages, and wagons.  In the 1830s, it branched out into the manufacture of railroad cars, one of the earliest manufacturers to do so.  In 1835, it developed the Grafton Street property with a factory for rail car manufacture.  The facility produced them until 1909, except during the American Civil War, when production was converted to gun carriages and forges.  Following the relocation of its rail car business, the company tore down the factory and built this industrial facility as a speculative venture to lease to other manufacturers.  It retained William Timmis, an industrial architect from New York City to design the building.  During World War II, businesses occupying the building manufactured proximity fuses for use in munitions.

See also
National Register of Historic Places listings in northwestern Worcester, Massachusetts
National Register of Historic Places listings in Worcester County, Massachusetts

References

Industrial buildings and structures on the National Register of Historic Places in Massachusetts
Buildings and structures in Worcester, Massachusetts
National Register of Historic Places in Worcester, Massachusetts